Haplogroup E-V38, also known as E1b1a-V38, is a human Y-chromosome DNA haplogroup. E-V38 is primarily distributed in sub-Saharan Africa. E-V38 has two basal branches, E-M329 and E-M2. E-M329 is a subclade mostly found in East Africa. E-M2 is the predominant subclade in West Africa, Central Africa, Southern Africa, and the region of African Great Lakes; it also occurs at moderate frequencies in some parts of North Africa, West Asia, and Southern Europe.

Origins

The discovery of two SNPs (V38 and V100) by Trombetta et al. (2011) significantly redefined the E-V38 phylogenetic tree. This led the authors to suggest that E-V38 may have originated in East Africa. V38 joins the West African-affiliated E-M2 and the Northeast African-affiliated E-M329 with an earlier common ancestor who, like E-P2, may have also originated in East Africa. The downstream SNP E-M180 may have originated in the humid south-central Saharan savanna/grassland of North Africa between 14,000 BP and 10,000 BP. According to Wood et al. (2005) and Rosa et al. (2007), such population movements changed the pre-existing population Y chromosomal diversity in Central, Southern, and Southeastern Africa, replacing the previous haplogroup frequencies in these areas with the now dominant E1b1a1 lineages. Traces of earlier inhabitants, however, can be observed today in these regions via the presence of the Y DNA haplogroups A1a, A1b, A2, A3, and B-M60 that are common in certain populations, such as the Mbuti and Khoisan.

Ancient DNA

Gad et al. (2021) indicates that Ramesses III and Unknown Man E, possibly Pentawere, carried haplogroup E1b1a.

At Cabeço da Amoreira, in Portugal, an enslaved West African man, who may have been from the Senegambian coastal region of Gambia, Mauritania, or Senegal, and carried haplogroups E1b1a and L3b1a, was buried among shell middens between the 16th century CE and the 18th century CE.

Distribution

E-V38's frequency and diversity are highest in West Africa. Within Africa, E-V38 displays a west-to-east as well as a south-to-north clinal distribution. In other words, the frequency of the haplogroup decreases as one moves from western and southern Africa toward the eastern and northern parts of Africa.

Subclades

E1b1a1

E1b1a1 is defined by markers DYS271/M2/SY81, M291, P1/PN1, P189, P293, V43, and V95. E-M2 is a diverse haplogroup with many branches.

E1b1a2

E1b1a2 is defined by the SNP mutation M329. E-M329 is mostly found in East Africa. E-M329 is also frequent in Southwestern Ethiopia, especially among Omotic-speaking populations.

Phylogenetics

Phylogenetic history

Prior to 2002, there were in academic literature at least seven naming systems for the Y-Chromosome Phylogenetic tree. This led to considerable confusion. In 2002, the major research groups came together and formed the Y-Chromosome Consortium (YCC). They published a joint paper that created a single new tree that all agreed to use. Later, a group of citizen scientists with an interest in population genetics and genetic genealogy formed a working group to create an amateur tree aiming at being above all timely.  The table below brings together all of these works at the point of the landmark 2002 YCC Tree. This allows a researcher reviewing older published literature to quickly move between nomenclatures.

Research publications

The following research teams per their publications were represented in the creation of the YCC tree.

Phylogenetic trees

This phylogenetic tree of haplogroup  subclades is based on the Y-Chromosome Consortium (YCC) 2008 Tree, the ISOGG Y-DNA Haplogroup E Tree, and subsequent published research.

 E1b1a (L222.1, V38, V100)
 E1b1a1 (DYS271/M2/SY81, M291, P1/PN1, P189, P293, V43, V95, Z1101, Z1107, Z1116, Z1120, Z1122, Z1123, Z1124, Z1125, Z1127, Z1130, Z1133)
 E1b1a2 (M329)

See also

Genetics

Y-DNA E subclades

Y-DNA backbone tree

Notes

References

Sources for conversion tables

External links

 Haplogroup E1b1a FTDNA Project
 Distribution of E1b1a/E3a in Africa
 Spread of Haplogroup E3a, from National Geographic

E1b1a